is a seasonal railway station on the Gala-Yuzawa Line in the town of Yuzawa, Niigata, Japan, operated by East Japan Railway Company (JR East).

Lines
The station is served by the Gala-Yuzawa Line from Echigo-Yuzawa Station, and forms the only station on this 1.8 km branch line. Services are classed as "Limited express", although they are actually extensions of Jōetsu Shinkansen Tanigawa services. The station is open to passengers only during the winter ski season, usually from mid-December until early May.

Layout
The station consists of an island platform serving two tracks. The station has a "Midori no Madoguchi" staffed ticket office.

Platforms

History
The station opened on 20 December 1990.

Passenger statistics
In fiscal 2017, the JR portion of the station was used by an average of 1,029 passengers daily (boarding passengers only). The passenger figures for previous years are as shown below.

Surrounding area

The station adjoins the Gala Yuzawa ski resort.

See also
 List of railway stations in Japan

References

External links

 JR East station information 
 Gala Yuzawa Snow Resort website 

Railway stations in Niigata Prefecture
Jōetsu Shinkansen
Railway stations in Japan opened in 1990
Yuzawa, Niigata